Emma Shinn is a military and criminal defense attorney.

History
Shinn served 20 years in the Marines before retiring as a captain in 2014. In 2016 Shinn transitioned from Male to Female. Shinn enlisted in the Marines at age 18 in 1994, serving as an infantryman for 10 years, specializing in blowing up tanks. In Operation Phantom Fury in Fallujah, Shinn was an infantry platoon sergeant. Upon returning to the US, Shinn was commissioned as an attorney and retired as a judge advocate. She later returned and attained the rank of Major. Shinn identifies as both Trans and Queer.

Shinn also served as a marine in California, Okinawa, North Carolina, the Congo, Sierra Leone, and Tunisia. As an advocate, Shinn served in Virginia, Rhode Island, Okinawa, Guantanamo, and the Pentagon. Shinn has also served as the president of SPART*A, a group of transgender people who currently serve or have served in the military.

Shinn transitioned in 2016, the year openly transgender people were allowed to serve under rules set in place by President Obama. Even though President Trump reversed the ruling in 2017, Shinn was allowed to continue as a marine.

References

Transgender people and the United States military
Year of birth missing (living people)
Living people